617 Patroclus is a large binary Jupiter trojan asteroid. It is a dark D-type asteroid and a slow rotator, due to the 103-hour orbital period of its two components. It is one of five Jupiter trojan asteroids targeted by the Lucy space probe, and is scheduled for a flyby in 2033. 

Patroclus was discovered on 17 October 1906, by astronomer August Kopff at the Heidelberg Observatory in Germany, and was named after Patroclus in Greek mythology. It was the second trojan to be discovered and the only member of the Trojan camp named after a Greek figure, as the convention of naming one 'camp' after Greek figures of the Trojan War and the other after Trojan figures had not yet been established. 

Patroclus was long thought to be one of the largest Jupiter trojans, with a diameter on the order of 150 km. However, in 2001 it was discovered to be a binary asteroid of two similarly sized objects. The name Patroclus is now assigned to the larger component, some 110–115 km in diameter, while the secondary, slightly smaller at 100–105 km in diameter, has been named Menoetius. This was the first discovery of a binary trojan asteroid.

Orbit 

It orbits the Sun at a distance of 4.5–5.9 AU once every 11 years and 11 months (4,353 days). Its orbit has an eccentricity of 0.14 and an inclination of 22° with respect to the ecliptic. The asteroid's observation arc begins at the discovering Heidelberg Observatory in November 1906, about 3 weeks after its official discovery observation.

Binary system 

{{Infobox planet
 | minorplanet     = yes
 | name            = Menoetius
 | background      = 
 | image           = File:617PatroclusMenoetius20131021.jpg
 | image_size      = 220px
 | caption         = Plot of the results of the multi-chord stellar occultation by 617 Patroclus and Menoetius
 | discovery_ref   = 
 | discovered      = 2001
 | discoverer      = 
 | discovery_site  = 
 | mpc_name        = 
 | alt_names       = 
 | pronounced      = 
 | named_after     = Menoetius 
 | mp_category     = 
 | adjectives       = Menoetian <ref>Redfield (1994) Nature and culture in the Iliad: the tragedy of Hector</ref>)
 | satellite_of    = Patroclus
 | orbit_ref       = 
 | epoch           = 
 | uncertainty     = 
 | observation_arc = 
 | aphelion        = 
 | perihelion      = 
 | semimajor       = 664.6 km
 | eccentricity    = 
 | period          = 
 | mean_anomaly    = 
 | mean_motion     = 
 | inclination     = 
 | dimensions      = 
 | mean_diameter   = 
 | mass            = 
 | volume          = 
 | density         = 
 | rotation        = 
 | albedo          = 
 | spectral_type   = 
 | abs_magnitude   = 
}}

In 2001, it was discovered that Patroclus is a binary system, made up of two components with of roughly similar size. It is one of six Trojan asteroids believed to be binary. In 2006, accurate measurements of the orbit from the Keck Laser guide star adaptive optics system were reported.

Combining these observations with thermal measurements taken in 2000, the sizes of the components of the system were estimated at 106 km and 98 km, with an equivalent whole-system diameter of 145 km, refined by later measurements from the Keck Observatory to approximately 122 km and 112 km for each partner, and a co-orbital period of  hours ( days).

On 21 October 2013, both bodies occulted a magnitude 8.8 star as observed by a team of 41 observers stationed across the USA.  Observation data put the orbital distance at the time of 664.6 km (with an unstated uncertainty), and give a size for the slightly larger component, which retains the name Patroclus with overall volume equivalent to a –diameter sphere, with the smaller component now named Menoetius with a volume equivalent to a –diameter sphere.

 Physical characteristics 

 Lightcurves 

Since 1989, several rotational lightcurves of Patroclus have been obtained from photometric observations. Analysis of the best rated lightcurves gave a rotation period between 102.8 and 103.5 hours with a brightness amplitude of less than 0.1 magnitude. A low brightness variation typically indicates that a body has a nearly spheroidal shape. Its long rotation period makes it a slow rotator.

 Diameter and albedo 

According to the surveys carried out by the Infrared Astronomical Satellite IRAS and NASA's Wide-field Infrared Survey Explorer with its subsequent NEOWISE mission, the Patroclus system has an effective combined size between 140.36 and 140.92 kilometers in diameter and its surface has an albedo of 0.047. The Collaborative Asteroid Lightcurve Link adopts the results obtained by IRAS, that is, an albedo of 0.0471 and a diameter of 140.92 kilometers based on an absolute magnitude of 8.19.

 Composition 

Recent evidence suggests that the objects are icy like comets, rather than rocky like most asteroids. In the Tholen classification, Patroclus is a dark P-type asteroid.

Because the density of the components (0.88 g/cm3) is less than water and about one third that of rock, it was suggested that the Patroclus system, previously thought to be a pair of rocky asteroids, is more similar to a comet in composition. It is suspected that many Jupiter trojans are in fact small planetesimals captured in the Lagrange point of  the Jupiter–Sun system during the migration of the giant planets 3.9 billion years ago. This scenario was proposed by A. Morbidelli and colleagues in a series of articles published in  May 2005 in Nature.

 Exploration 

The Patroclus–Menoetius system is a scheduled target for Lucy, a flyby mission to multiple asteroids, mostly Jupiter trojans.

 Name 

This minor planet was named after the legendary Greek hero Patroclus. Friend and lover of Achilles, he was killed by Hector during the Trojan War. (See 588 Achilles and 624 Hektor.) The name was proposed by Austrian astronomer Johann Palisa. The official naming citation was mentioned in The Names of the Minor Planets by Paul Herget in 1955.

In Greek and thus in Latin, Patroclus'' has all short vowels. Thus the expected English pronunciation would be with stress on the 'a', *. However, Alexander Pope shifted the stress to the first 'o', a convention allowed in Latin poetry, for metrical convenience in his verse translation of Homer, and this irregular pronunciation has become established in English.

The satellite Menoetius (official designation (617) Patroclus I Menoetius) was named after the legendary father of Patroclus. It was previously known by the provisional designation .

Patroclus and Menoetius are the only objects in the Trojan camp to be named after Greek rather than Trojan characters. The naming conventions for the Jupiter trojans were not adopted until after Patroclus was named (similarly, the asteroid Hektor is the only Trojan character to appear in the Greek camp).

Notes

References

External links 
 Keck Obs. press release Trojan Asteroid Patroclus: Comet in Disguise?
 Patroclus and Menoetius web page
 Asteroids with Satellites, Robert Johnston, johnstonsarchive.net
 Asteroid Lightcurve Database (LCDB), query form (info )
 Dictionary of Minor Planet Names, Google books
 Discovery Circumstances: Numbered Minor Planets (1)-(5000) – Minor Planet Center
 
 

Jupiter trojans (Trojan camp)
Patroclus
Patroclus
Binary asteroids
Minor planets to be visited by spacecraft
Slow rotating minor planets
P-type asteroids (Tholen)
Objects observed by stellar occultation
19061017